Rabphilin-3A is a protein that in humans is encoded by the RPH3A gene.
It contains two C2 domains and binds calcium ions at low micromolar concentration. Rabphilin was shown to regulate neurotransmitter release in hippocampal neurons after neurons had an increased synaptic activity and their release rate was depressed.

Interactions
RPH3A has been shown to interact with RAB3A, RAB3B and CASK.

References

Further reading